Alfredo Villagracia Lagmay (August 14, 1919 –December 15, 2005) was a respected Filipino psychologist and Professor Emeritus of Psychology at the University of the Philippines Diliman. He received his Ph.D. in psychology from Harvard University and trained under the renowned psychologist and founder of the radical behaviorism movement B.F. Skinner.

He was conferred the distinction of National Scientist of the Philippines, the highest recognition given to Filipino scientists, in 1988. He is the father of University of the Philippines geology professor Alfredo Mahar Lagmay.

References

1919 births
2005 deaths
21st-century Filipino scientists
Harvard University alumni
Burials at the Libingan ng mga Bayani
Academic staff of the University of the Philippines
Filipino expatriates in the United States
20th-century Filipino scientists
National Scientists of the Philippines